The 2010 North West 200 Races, the 71st running of the event, was held on Saturday 15 May 2010 at the circuit, dubbed "The Triangle", based around the towns of Portstewart, Coleraine and Portrush, in Northern Ireland.

The first Superbike race was won by John McGuinness followed by Alastair Seeley winning the first 600cc Supersport race. First-time winners at the North West 200 were Paul Robinson in the 125cc race and Keith Amor in the 1000cc Superstock Race. Amor's victory was also the first win for BMW and the first non-Japanese manufacturer to claim a victory since 1997. The Blue Riband event, the North West 200 Superbike Race, produced a second win of the meeting for Alastair Seeley and the first local winner of the race since Phillip McCallen in 1997 . The final race of the meeting, the 600cc Supersport 2 race was won by Ian Hutchinson.

New for the 2010 event was the introduction of the daytime practice on the Thursday rather than the normal evening slot. The reasons for the change includes giving the riders the opportunity to practice in conditions similar to race day and also because of the extra time allowing classes to run separately. Race Director Mervyn Whyte MBE said that "altering the time of the traditional Thursday practice session will dramatically improve overall safety at the event." In an additional bid to improve safety, Mather's Cross was widened at the end of 2009. For 2010 further modifications were made to the circuit to improve safety. A new purpose built chicane was introduced near Mather's Cross to reduce speeds at the corner and safety improvement were made to the area at Station corner.

Practice 
During practice on Tuesday evening Stuart Easton set a new fastest speed trap time, touching  on the approach to University Corner. Steve Plater who had set the fastest time in Superbike practice on the Tuesday was injured in an accident during Thursday practice. Plater suffering a broken arm when he came off his bike at Quarry Hill on the Coast Road section of the course.

Races 
The first event, the five lap Superbike race, was delayed by over-night rain to allow the circuit to dry and also due to a medical emergency at Metropole Corner in Portrush. The delayed race was reduced to four laps (35.744 miles). These delays along with another medical emergency lead to other race reductions, including the North West 200 being cut from six to four laps. The event remained dry and there were no major crashes or injuries. The only notable incident was Conor Cummins high-siding his bike on the exit of University Corner during the Superstock race. Cummins was uninjured.

Results

Practice

Practice Times & Leaderboard Race 1 & 6 – 1000cc Superbike class

Practice Times & Leaderboard Race 2 & 5 – 600cc Supersport class

Practice Times & Leaderboard Race 3 – 125cc class

Practice Times & Leaderboard Race 4 – 1000cc Superstock class

Race results

Race 1; Superbike Race final standings 
Saturday 15 May 2010 4 laps – 35.744 miles

Fastest Lap: Alastair Seeley, 4'26.909 on lap 2

Race 2; Supersport Race final standings 
Saturday 15 May 2010 5 laps – 44.71 miles

Fastest Lap: Alastair Seeley, 4' 39.386 on lap 3

Race 3; 125cc Race final standings 
Saturday 15 May 2010 5 laps – 44.71 miles

Fastest Lap: Paul Robinson, 5' 32.513 on lap 3

Race 4; Superstock Race final standings 
Saturday 15 May 2010 5 laps – 44.71 miles

Fastest Lap: Michael Rutter, 4'30.027 on lap 5

 Race 5; North West 200 Superbike Race final standings 
Saturday 15 May 2010 4 laps – 35.744 milesFastest Lap: Alastair Seeley, 4'26.909 on lap 3 Race 6; Supersport Race 2 final standings 
Saturday 15 May 2010 4 laps – 35.744 milesFastest Lap and new class record: Keith Amor, 4' 37.591 on lap 3''

See also 
 North West 200 – History and results from the event

References

External links 
 https://web.archive.org/web/20070309173345/http://www.northwest200.org/ The Official North 200 Website
 http://www.bbc.co.uk/northernireland/nw200/ BBC North West 200 Website

2010
North West 200
North West 200
North